Saariselkä (Inari Sami: Suolluščielgi, literally islandback) is a fell area in Lapland, northern Finland. It is located in the Inari, Savukoski and Sodankylä municipalities. The range is mostly 2 billion-year-old granulite. The last ice age ended 9500 years ago in Saariselkä.

Tourism
Saariselkä is partly in Urho Kekkonen National Park. The hill area is a popular tourist destination, providing activities such as skiing, hiking and spa.

Many couples want to have a "white wedding" in Lapland in the winter when there is snow everywhere. A couple may come to the chapel in a sledge pulled by husky dogs or reindeer. Pyhän Olavin Kappeli (St. Olaf's Chapel) and a small wooden Tievakappeli (Tieva Chapel) near Hotel & Igloo Village Kakslauttanen in Saariselkä have been popular places for white weddings. Other possible venues include reindeer farms.

Magnetic hill
Part of the former Finnish Highway 4 in Saariselkä is known nowadays as Magnetic hill. During World War II the road from Rovaniemi to Petsamo (Arctic Ocean's Highway) was extremely important to the Finns. Petsamo and its harbour was the only open way to the ocean. The hills beside Kaunispää-fjeld are so steep that 1940's trucks could not easily climb them. Folks thought there was some magnetic force in the hill that squeezed all the power out of the motors. After a realignment of Highway 4 that short section was taken out of daily use. It has been declared the "Magnetic Hill Road Museum".

References

External links

Official home page of Saariselkä (Finnish)
Official home page of Saariselkä (English)
Accommodation in Saariselkä
Saariselka Finland - Information on the area and resort
Saariselkä webcam

Mountains of Finland
Villages in Inari, Finland